Mokrushino is a rural locality (a village) in Yenangskoye Rural Settlement, Kichmengsko-Gorodetsky District, Vologda Oblast, Russia. The population was 24 as of 2002.

Geography 
Mokrushino is located 82 km southeast of Kichmengsky Gorodok (the district's administrative centre) by road. Maloye Pozharovo is the nearest rural locality.

References 

Rural localities in Kichmengsko-Gorodetsky District